The Federal Building of Little Rock, Arkansas is located at 700 West Capitol Avenue, adjacent to the Richard Sheppard Arnold United States Post Office and Courthouse.  It is a large seven-story Modern structure, occupying an entire city block, built in 1962 to the designs of the local firms of Swaim & Allen & Associates and Ginocchio, Cromwell & Associates.  Utilizing modern curtain-wall construction, its exterior (on all four sides) is dominated on the upper floors by a narrow windows separated by limestone spandrels.  The south-facing main entrance is recessed, consisting of several pairs of double doors, with flanking gold-colored grillwork. The building was built by Robert E. McKee General Contractor, Inc. of Dallas, Texas.

The building was listed on the National Register of Historic Places in 2015.

See also
National Register of Historic Places listings in Little Rock, Arkansas

References

Federal buildings in the United States
Government buildings completed in 1961
Buildings and structures in Little Rock, Arkansas
Government buildings on the National Register of Historic Places in Arkansas
National Register of Historic Places in Little Rock, Arkansas